The H. Allen Jerkens Memorial Stakes is a Grade I American thoroughbred horse race for three-year-olds run over a distance of seven furlongs on the dirt held in August at Saratoga Race Course in Saratoga Springs, New York. The current purse for the event is $500,000.

History

The inaugural running of the event was on 18 August 1984 as the seventh race on the undercard of Travers Stakes day as The King's Bishop Stakes and was won by Commemorate who was trained by Hall of Fame trainer Lazaro Barrera in a time of 1:22. King's Bishop was originally owned by Houston Astros founding president Craig F. Cullinan Jr. and trained by H. Allen Jerkens, who trained the horse to wins in the 1973 Carter Handicap and Fall Highweight Handicap for Allaire du Pont.

The event was not held in 1986.

In 1987 the event was classified as Grade III, upgraded to Grade II in 1992 and since 1999 the race has been a Grade I event.

In 2017 the New York Racing Association renamed the race for the late Hall of Fame trainer H. Allen Jerkens, who over a career spanning seven decades, his horses had upset racing champions – such as Onion's victory over Secretariat in the 1973 Whitney Handicap – earning him the nickname "the Giant Killer".

Several winners of the race have gone on to win American Champion Sprint Horse honors that same year, including Housebuster (1990), Lost in the Fog (2005), Runhappy (2015) and Drefong (2016). Hard Spun (2007) went on to top that year's World's Best Racehorse Rankings for three-year-old sprinters.

Records
Speed record:
1:20.54 – Runhappy (2015)

Margins:
 lengths – Tale of the Cat (1997)

Most wins by a jockey:
4 – John Velazquez (2002, 2006, 2010, 2019)
4 – Mike E. Smith (1991, 1992, 1993, 2016)

Most wins by a trainer:
5 – D. Wayne Lukas (1985, 1989, 1992, 1994, 1996)

Most wins by an owner:
2 – Lloyd R. French Jr. (1985, 1989)
2 – Michael Tabor (1996, 2004)

Winners

Notes:

† In the 2009 event Vineyard Haven was first past the post but disqualified for drifting out in the straight and twice bumping Capt. Candyman Can. Capt. Candyman Can was declared the winner.

See also
List of American and Canadian Graded races

External links
 at Hello Race Fans

References

Grade 1 stakes races in the United States
Flat horse races for three-year-olds
Recurring sporting events established in 1984
Horse races in New York (state)
Saratoga Race Course
1984 establishments in New York (state)